Bismillah Chowk is a neighbourhood in the Baldia Town municipality of Karachi Pakistan. There are several ethnic groups in Baldia including Urdu speakers, Balochs, Brahuis,
Seraikis, Kashmiris, Pashtuns, Sindhis, Memons, Bohras, Ismailis. Over 97% of the population is Muslim.

References

External links 
 Karachi Website.
 Lahore Website of Online Sharings.

Neighbourhoods of Karachi

External links 
 Lahore Website.